Crewe is a town in Cheshire, England.

Crewe may also refer to:

Places
Crewe (crater), a crater on Mars named after the English town
Crewe (UK Parliament constituency), a defunct House of Commons constituency
Crewe, Virginia, United States
Crewe Green, a village and civil parish to the east of Crewe, England, historically named Crewe
Crewe railway station, a large railway station serving the town of Crewe, England
Crewe and Nantwich, Cheshire, England
Crewe-by-Farndon, Cheshire, England

Other
Crewe (surname)
Crewe Offley (1682–1739), British landowner and Whig politician
Crewe United F.C., an intermediate-level football club in Northern Ireland
Baron Crewe, an extinct title in the Peerage of the United Kingdom
Marquess of Crewe, an extinct title in the Peerage of the United Kingdom
Sara Crewe, the main character in the children's novel A Little Princess by Frances Hodgson Burnett
Corporate Representatives for Ethical Wikipedia Engagement (CREWE), an organization of public relations officials and Wikipedia editors

See also
Lord Crewe (disambiguation)

Crew (disambiguation)